Armstrong Township is one of eight townships in Vanderburgh County, Indiana, United States.  As of the 2010 census, its population was 1,599 and it contained 634 housing units.

Armstrong Township was established in 1818.

Geography

Cities and towns
 Darmstadt (west edge)

Unincorporated towns
 Armstrong
 Crossroads
 Martin

Adjacent townships
 Vanderburgh County
 German Township (south)
 Scott Township (east)
 Gibson County
 Johnson Township (northeast)
 Posey County
 Robinson Township (southwest)
 Smith Township (northwest)

Airports and landing strips
 Hepler Airport

School districts
 Evansville-Vanderburgh School Corporation
 South Gibson School Corporation

Political districts
 Indiana's 8th congressional district
 State House District 75
 State Senate District 49

References
 
 United States Census Bureau 2007 TIGER/Line Shapefiles
 IndianaMap

External links

Townships in Vanderburgh County, Indiana
Townships in Indiana